John Kenneth Emmerson (March 17, 1908 – March 24, 1984) was an American diplomat, and specialist on Japan and Northeast Asia.

Early life
Emmerson was a native of Cañon City, Colorado. He earned degrees from the Sorbonne, Colorado College and New York University. He served in Taiwan and Japan before World War II. Before the war, he served under Ambassador Joseph Grew in Tokyo.

World War II

In October 1944, Emmerson was sent to Yenan in China to interrogate Japanese prisoners of war captured by Chinese communists. In Yanan, Emmerson met Sanzo Nosaka (who was using the alias Susumu Okano at the time), leader of the Japanese Communist Party.

Post-war

After the war, Emmerson returned to Japan as an adviser to Gen. Douglas MacArthur. He was attached to the Political Adviser's Office (POLAD). On October 5, 1945,  Emmerson, along with E. Herbert Norman, drove to Fuchu Prison and met prominent Communists incarcerated there, including Tokuda Kyuichi, Shiga Yoshio, and Kim Chon-hae. Emmerson later served as deputy chief of mission in Tokyo under Ambassador Edwin O. Reischauer. Emmerson returned to Washington in February 1946.

Emmerson was given the State Department's meritorious service award in 1954 and the personal rank of Minister in 1959. Emmerson left his last foreign post in 1966 when he was deputy chief of mission at the United States Embassy in Tokyo. He became diplomat in residence at Stanford University. He retired in 1968. Emmerson died in 1984 at Stanford University Hospital after a stroke. He was 76 years old. He was survived by his wife, Dorothy McLaughlin; a daughter, actress and singer Dorothy Louise Emmerson; a son, Stanford professor and Southeast Asia specialist Donald Kenneth Emmerson; a sister, Theodora E. Sinden, and two grandchildren.

Works

References

External links

1908 births
1984 deaths
20th-century American diplomats
People from Cañon City, Colorado
Colorado College alumni
People from Stanford, California